The swarmandal, surmandal, or Indian harp is a plucked box zither, originating from India, similar to the qanun that is today most commonly used as an accompanying instrument for vocal Indian classical music. It is part of the culture of Northern India and is used in concerts to accompany vocal music. The name combines Sanskrit words svara (notes) and maṇḍala (circle), representing its ability to produce many notes.  The instrument was seen as equivalent by the Ā'īn-i-akbarī to the qanun.

Construction 
Modern swarmandals are similar to European psaltries. Autoharps are used as an equivalent instrument in India today, especially with the chord-button mechanism taken out. Modern swarmandals are trapezoidal and measure  in length and  width. Instruments may have as many as 40 strings, while older instruments from the 19th century were recorded as having 21 strings. The strings are hooked in a nail lodged in the right edge of the swarmandal and on the left are wound around tuning pegs which can be tightened with a special key. Wooden pegs were used instead of metal ones in the medieval period. A sharp  ridge on both sides of the swarmandal stands a little apart from the nails on which the strings are tightened. This ridge functions as a bridge on both sides. The swarmandal is similar to the autoharp or zither in many respects.

History 

The swarmandal may be the same as  the 13th-century instrument known as the mattakokilā (intoxicated cuckoo). In the Mughal period, the swarmandal was seen as equivalent by the Ā'īn-i-akbarī to the qanun. In the 19th century, a writer commented that good performances on the instrument were rare, because it was difficult to play and, at the time, expensive to buy.

In popular culture 
Several modern artists have performed with the instrument. Some of the vocalists who have used it extensively are Bade Ghulam Ali Khan, Salamat Ali Khan, Jasraj, Kishori Amonkar, Rashid Khan, and Ajoy Chakrabarty. After travelling to India in late 1966, George Harrison introduced the swarmandal into the Beatles' sound on their 1967 single "Strawberry Fields Forever". He also played it on his Indian classical-style composition "Within You Without You", from the band's Sgt. Pepper's Lonely Hearts Club Band album.

See also
 Drone (music)
 Hindustani classical music
 Zither

References

Hindustani musical instruments
Box zithers